Lophocampa dinora is a moth of the family Erebidae. It was described by William Schaus in 1924. It is found in Argentina and Bolivia.

Description
Male: Abdomen above orange buff; dorsal black spots, larger terminally, containing white scales; lateral triangular white spots edged with black; underneath white with transverse black lines. Legs with black orange and white markings. Forewing white faintly tinged with buff, the markings fuscous black except a small orange buff spot at base; veins fuscous black. Hindwing white. Wings below very similar to upperside.

Wingspan 44 mm.

References

 Natural History Museum Lepidoptera generic names catalog

dinora
Moths described in 1924